The National Committee was a Greek political party founded by Epameinondas Deligiorgis.

The party was founded in 1865, and was composed by young revolutionaries who helped to overthrow King Otto, ending his semi-absolutist reign. The party wasn't linked with the traditional parties (English, French and Russian), and wasn't associated with a particular ideology.
The National Committee tried to establish a strong parliamentary system, along with economic modernization, supporting the creation of infrastructures. It also campaigned for a military reform and a cultural expansion in the Ottoman Empire.

However, the absence of a strong party's apparatus caused its dissolution after Deligiorgis' death in 1879.

References

Defunct political parties in Greece
1863 establishments in Greece
Political parties established in 1863